

Seeds
A champion seed is indicated in bold text while text in italics indicates the round in which that seed was eliminated.

  Yevgeny Kafelnikov (second round)
  Marcelo Ríos (second round)
  Fernando Vicente (first round)
  Marat Safin (champion)
  Carlos Moyà (quarterfinals)
  Mariano Puerta (semifinals)
  Francisco Clavet (first round)
  Jeff Tarango (second round)

Draw

External links
 2000 Majorca Open draw

Singles